Chloé Jouannet (born 17 October 1997) is a French-Swiss actress.

Biography 
Jouannet is the daughter of actors Thomas Jouannet and Alexandra Lamy.

She made her first appearance in cinema at the age of 12 in a small role in the film Lucky Luke, where she acted alongside her mother and step-father, Jean Dujardin, but it was due to her role in the dramatic comedy My Summer in Provence, directed by Rose Bosch, that she came to prominence, where she played a rebellious teenager along with Jean Reno and Anna Galiena.

Personal life 
In 2016, she officially confirmed her relationship with the actor .

She lived in London with her mother between 2013 and 2018.

Filmography

Film 

 2009: Lucky Luke (directed by James Huth) Eleanor
 2014: My Summer in Provence (directed by Rose Bosch) Léa
 2018:  (directed by ) Raphaëlle, one of Stéphane's daughters
 2019: Street Flow (directed by Kery James and ) Lisa

TV 

 2017-2019: Riviera (directed by Philipp Kadelbach) (series)
 Since 2019: Infidèle (created by ) (series)
 2019:  (directed by Yann Samuell) (TV film)

Theatre 

References

External links 

 
 
 Chloé Jouannet on Notre cinéma 
 

1997 births
Living people
French film actresses
French television actresses
French stage actresses
French child actresses
21st-century French actresses
Swiss film actresses
Swiss television actresses
Swiss stage actresses